Longshore may refer to:

People
Ashley Longshore, American painter and entrepreneur
Dick Longshore (1926–1988), American Navy veteran and politician
Hannah Longshore (1819–1901), American physician
Lucretia Longshore Blankenburg (1845–1937), American suffragist and writer
Nate Longshore (born 1986), American Football player
William H. Longshore (1841–1909), Civil War Medal of Honor Recipient
Anna M. Longshore Potts (1829–1912), physician

Other uses
Longshore Sailing School
Longshore drift
Longshoreman